Idiotephria is a genus of moths in the family Geometridae described by Inoue in 1943.

Species
Idiotephria amelia (Butler, 1878)
Idiotephria debilitata (Leech, 1891)
Idiotephria evanescens (Staudinger, 1897)
Idiotephria nakatomii Inoue, 1978
Idiotephria occidentalis Yazaki, 1993

References

Larentiini